Domus Academy is a private school of design in Milan, Italy. It offers post-graduate and professional courses in fashion, industrial design, and design management. It is not listed by the Ministero dell'Istruzione, dell'Università e della Ricerca, the Italian ministry of education, among the institutions authorised to award degrees in music, dance and the arts.

Maria Grazia Mazzocchi was president of the school. Gianfranco Ferré was on the staff from 1983 to 1989, and Andrea Branzi was cultural director for the first ten years. In 2009 the school was bought by Laureate Education of Baltimore, Maryland for an estimated ten million euros. In 2018 Laureate sold it to the British Galileo Global Education group.

References

Art schools in Italy
Fashion schools
Design schools in Italy
Communication design
Education in Milan
Higher education in Italy
Educational institutions established in 1982
1982 establishments in Italy
Italian fashion